Rudulph Evans (February 1, 1878 – January 16, 1960) was a sculptor.

Early life

Rudolph Evans was born February 1, 1878 in Washington, D.C. to Frank L. Evans, the descendant of a Quaker family, and Elizabeth J. Grimes, the daughter of Gassaway Sellman Grimes, a physician. He grew up in Front Royal, Virginia, and studied in France at the École des Beaux-Arts; his fellow students included Auguste Rodin and Augustus Saint-Gaudens. He also studied at Corcoran School of Art under Edith Ogden Heidel.

Career
After returning to the United States in 1900, Evans established and maintained a studio in New York City] In 1918, he was elected into the National Academy of Design as an associate member and became a full academician in 1929. He moved back to Washington, D.C. in 1949. Evans designed the statue of Thomas Jefferson inside the Jefferson Memorial in Washington, D.C. At the time the memorial was inaugurated, in 1943, due to material shortages during World War II, the statue was of plaster patinated to resemble bronze; the finished bronze was cast by Roman Bronze Works of New York City in 1947.

Evans' other noted works include the statues of Julius Sterling Morton (1937) and of William Jennings Bryan (1937), both in the National Statuary Hall Collection of the United States Capitol. Evans also sculpted the statue of Robert E. Lee (1932) in the Virginia State Capitol.

Notes

References
Yonkers, Tescia Ann. "Behold His Bronze Likeness: Rudulph Evans's Statue of Robert E. Lee." Virginia Cavalcade 34 (Autumn 1984): 90–95.

External links

Evans's statue of Robert E. Lee for the Virginia State Capitol

American alumni of the École des Beaux-Arts
1878 births
1960 deaths
20th-century American sculptors
American male sculptors
National Academy of Design members
Artists from Washington, D.C.
Sculptors from Virginia
National Sculpture Society members
People from Front Royal, Virginia
20th-century American male artists
Members of the American Academy of Arts and Letters